Binwalia is a village in West Champaran district in the Indian state of Bihar.

Demographics
As of 2011 India census, Binwalia had a population of 3668 in 734 households. Males constitute 52% of the population and females 47%. Binwalia has an average literacy rate of 34.24%, lower than the national average of 74%: male literacy is 66.64%, and female literacy is 33.35%. In Binwalia, 24.45% of the population is under 6 years of age.

References

Villages in West Champaran district